Jameela Malik (1945/1946 – 28 January 2020) was an Indian actress in south Indian movies. She acted in Malayalam and Tamil films in the 1970s and 1980s. She received critical acclaim and appreciation, for all the movies she acted, from the critics and audience as well. She entered the film industry with the film Aadhyathe Katha in 1972. She was the first woman from Kerala to graduate from the Film and Television Institute of India. She worked as teacher in schools. She was married for a year and had a son. She had also acted in more than twenty television serials during the 1990s. She died on 28 January 2020 at the age of 74.

Partial filmography

Malayalam
 Faces
 Line Bus (1971)
 Sathi (1972)
 Aadhyathe Katha (1972)
 Ragging (1973)
 Eanippadikal (1973)
 Rajahamsam (1974)
 Neelakannukal (1974)
 Rahasyarathri (1974)
 Boy Friend (1975)
 Niramaala (1975)
 Ullasa Yaathra (1975)
 Chottanikkara Amma (1976)
 Sexilla Stundilla (1976)
 Swarna Medal (1977)
 Society Lady (1978)
 Avakaasham (1978)
 Kazhukan (1979)
 Daaliya Pookkal (1980)
 Lahari (1982)
 Pandavapuram (1986) as Devi teacher
 Oru Maymasa Pulariyil (1989)
 Unnikuttanu Joli Kitti (1990)

Tamil
 Velli Ratham (1979)
 Adhisaya Raagam (1979)
 Lakshmi (1979)
 Nadhiyai Thedi Vandha Kadal (1980)
 Ponnazhagi (1981)
 Sriman Srimati (1982)

As a dubbing artist
 Mayura (1975)

Radio dramas

Television
 Kayar
 Sagarika
 Mangalyapattu (Mazhavil Manorama)
 Chempattu (Asianet)

References

External links

1940s births
2020 deaths
Actresses in Malayalam cinema
Indian film actresses
Actresses in Tamil cinema
Actresses in Malayalam television
Indian television actresses
Indian voice actresses
20th-century Indian actresses
Actresses from Kollam